John Kennedy (born November 17, 1967) is an American puppeteer who has worked with The Jim Henson Company since 1990. He hails from Plainfield, Indiana. From 1991 until 2003, Kennedy took over Jim Henson's role of Dr. Teeth, after which Bill Barretta took over in 2005. Kennedy has also performed Kermit the Frog on Disney Cruise Line, replacing Steve Whitmire.

Characters
Dr. Teeth (1991–2003)
Floyd Pepper (2005–2006)
The Wubbulous World of Dr. Seuss – Horton the Elephant, Mr. Knox, Sam-I-Am, Little Cat C, Uncle Docks, Etc.
Sesame Street
Kermit the Frog (Disney Cruise Lines)
Apollo (Jim Henson's Pajanimals)
Floyd Pepper (The Muppets' Wizard of Oz (2005) & The Muppets: A Green and Red Christmas (2006))
The Muppets' Wizard of Oz: Angel Marie (2005)
Bernie the Pig (Fetch! with Ruff Ruffman) (2006–2010)
Kermit's Swamp Years: Blotch and Arnie the Alligator (2002)
Animal Jam: DJ 1 (2003)
Sesame Street episode 4111: Cookie World (baby's Dad), The Amazing Mumford (2018-present)Julie's Greenroom: Toby the DogDash's Adulthood: A Tribute to Starsky & Hutch: AustinJack's Big Music Show: Mel

EventsThe Muppets Take the Bowl: Additional Muppet Performer; live show at the Hollywood Bowl, Sept. 8–10, 2017The Muppets Take the O2'': Additional Muppet Performer; live show at the O2 Arena, Jul. 13-14, 2018

Books 
Kennedy has written instructional books on puppeteering, aimed at younger audiences:

References

External links
Biography at PuppetKit

1967 births
Living people
American puppeteers
Muppet performers
People from Plainfield, Indiana